Qianjin may refer to:

Mainland China
Qianjin District, Jiamusi (前进区), Heilongjiang
Subdistricts
Qianjin Subdistrict, Jiayuguan, in Jiayuguan City, Gansu
Qianjin Subdistrict, Guangzhou, in Tianhe District, Guangzhou, Guangdong
Qianjin Subdistrict, Mudanjiang, in Yangming District, Mudanjiang, Heilongjiang
Qianjin Subdistrict, Yichun, Heilongjiang, in Yichun District, Yichun, Heilongjiang
Qianjin Subdistrict, Sanmenxia, in Hubin District, Sanmenxia, Henan
Qianjin Subdistrict, Shangqiu, in Liangyuan District, Shangqiu, Henan
Qianjin Subdistrict, Xinyang, in Pingqiao District, Xinyang, Henan
Qianjin Subdistrict, Wuhan, in Jianghan District, Wuhan, Hubei
Qianjin Subdistrict, Benxi, in Pingshan District, Benxi, Liaoning
Qianjin Subdistrict, Chaoyang, Liaoning, in Shuangta District, Chaoyang, Liaoning
Qianjin Subdistrict, Shenyang, in Dongling District, Shenyang, Liaoning

Towns
Qianjin, Huzhou (千金镇), in Nanxun District, Huzhou, Zhejiang

Written as "前进镇":
Qianjin, Lianshui County, in Lianshui County, Jiangsu
Qianjin, Qionglai, in Qionglai City, Sichuan

Townships (前进乡)
Qianjin Township, Hailun, in Hailun City, Heilongjiang
Qianjin Township, Nenjiang County, in Nenjiang County, Jilin
Qianjin Township, Changling County, in Changling County, Jilin
Qianjin Township, Jiaohe, in Jiaohe City, Jilin
Qianjin Township, Yushu, Jilin, in Yushu City, Jilin
Qianjin Township, Lingyuan, in Lingyuan City, Liaoning
Qianjin Township, Ankang, in Hanbin District, Ankang, Shaanxi

Village
Qianjin, Gaocheng, in Gaocheng, Sui County, Suizhou, Hubei

Taiwan
Cianjin District, Kaohsiung, district of Kaohsiung